Punitaqui is a town and commune of Chile in the Limarí Province.

History
Punitaqui was once part of the Ovalle Department before the administrative restructuring of 1976.

1997 earthquake

On October 15, 1997 the town was nearly demolished by an estimated 7.1 Mw earthquake. Damage ranged from as far north as the Antofagasta Region to the southern Araucanía Region. Both Santiago and Valparaíso Region lost telephone service and radio transmissions. The quake left 8 people dead, 360 injured and 59,913 homeless, concentrating most of those in the provinces of Elqui and Limarí.

Demographics
The population grew 9.4% (816 persons) between 1992 and 2002. There are 3,615 inhabitants in urban areas and 5,924 in rural areas.

Administration
As a commune, Punitaqui is a third-level administrative division of Chile administered by a municipal council, headed by an alcalde who is directly elected every four years. The 2016-2020 alcalde is Carlos Araya Bugueño.

Within the electoral divisions of Chile, Punitaqui is represented in the Chamber of Deputies by Mr. Miguel Alvarado (PDC) and Mr. Luis Lemus (Ind.) as part of the 9th electoral district, (together with Combarbalá, Monte Patria, Illapel, Salamanca, Los Vilos, Canela). The commune is represented in the Senate by Adriana Muños (PDC) and Jorge Pizarro Soto (PDC) as part of the 4th senatorial constituency (Coquimbo Region).

References

External links
  Municipality of Punitaqui

Communes of Chile
Populated places in Limarí Province
1785 establishments in the Spanish Empire